The women's 10 kilometres walk event at the 1995 Summer Universiade was held on 2 September in Fukuoka, Japan.

Results

References

Athletics at the 1995 Summer Universiade
1995 in women's athletics
1995